Fumana laevipes is a species of shrub in the family Cistaceae. They have a self-supporting growth form and simple, broad leaves and dry fruit. Individuals can grow to 10 cm tall.

Sources

References 

laevipes
Flora of Malta